Atlanaul (Atlan-avul) is a rural locality (a selo) in Buynaksky District, Republic of Dagestan, Russia. The population was 2,375 as of 2010. There are 58 streets.

Geography 
Atlanaul is located 4 km southeast of Buynaksk (the district's administrative centre) by road. Buynaksk is the nearest rural locality.

References 

Rural localities in Buynaksky District